Albert Boadella Oncins (born 30 July 1943, in Barcelona) is a Spanish actor and playwright. Until 2012,he was the director of the Els Joglars theatre company.

Biography
He studied dramatic art at the Institut del Teatre of Barcelona, at the Centre Dramatique de l'Est (Strasbourg) and corporal expression in Paris. While still a student he was part of the mime artist company of Italo Riccardi.

In 1962, when he was only 19 years old, he founded in Barcelona, together with his colleagues  and Anton Font, the company in which he developed his entire career as an actor, director and playwright. With Els Joglars has more than thirty plays. His works tend to have a strong critical and satirical charge, especially with the established power and with any factual power, especially the Catholic Church. That is why he has suffered problems with political authorities of different sign.

His first major problem with the authorities took place on 2 December 1977. By La Torna, a satire of the process to Heinz Chez, was imprisoned to be subjected to a court-martial for an alleged offense of insulting the Army. The day before the hearing he staged a spectacular escape from prison and took refuge in France.

Back in Spain, he continued to create controversy with works such as Teledeum, Ubú president, acid criticism of Jordi Pujol, or Dalí.

Apart from his theatrical curriculum, he has created and directed several television programs for different networks, and is the author of the books El Rapto de Talía [The kidnapping of Talía] (DeBolsillo, 2000) and the memoir Memorias de un bufón [Memoirs of a Jester] (Espasa Calpe, 2001).

In 2003 he wrote the screenplay and directed the film Buen viaje, excelencia, a caricature of the last months of life of the general Franco.

A great fan of bullfighting, and public defender of the art of cúchares, Boadella has frequently placed the emotion of the bullfighting ritual above the rest of the arts. In December 2006, he premiered a small format work in Madrid, in the same way as medieval debates, entitled Controversy of the bull and the bullfighter, where reasons for and against the tradition alternate. His support for bullfighting has earned him the admiration of important figures of bullfighting as José Tomás and Enrique Ponce, as acerbic critics by anti-bullfighting sectors. In his memoirs, Boadella takes the latter with sportsmanship:

In September 2007 his essay of memories Goodbye Catalonia. Chronicles of love and war won the 24th Premio Espasa de Ensayo awards. At the presentation of the book, he explained that his goodbye to Catalonia was not metaphorical, but real: he announced that he would not work again more in Catalonia before the boycott suffered by his works in his own land.

Since 2009, as announced in September 2008, following the Government's offer of the Community of Madrid, he was the artistic director of the Teatros del Canal.

On 11 September 2012 he announced the transfer of the management of the company Els Joglars to Ramon Fontserè. The announcement was made during the presentation of the 2012-13 season of the Compañía Nacional de Teatro Clásico, with which Els Joglars has produced Miguel de Cervantes' play The Dialogue of the Dogs (El coloquio de los perros)

In December 2012 he was awarded the Alfonso Ussía awards in the category of Person of the Year, together with Arturo Fernández.

During 2017 he received the 20th Pepe Isbert National Theater Awards granted by Amigos de los Teatros Históricos de España (Friends of the Historical Theaters of Spain) (AMIThE) and the 13th "Joaquín Vidal" national university awards in bullfighting, awarded by the Círculo Taurino Universitario Don Luis Mazzantini.

Ideological trajectory 

Albert Boadella was close in his first youth to Catalanist positions and, in general, to the Catalan anti-Francoist left, of which he was a cultural icon (he acted habitually along with the members of the nova cançó), whose critical moment was the council of war that it suffered in 1977. After the restoration of the Generalitat de Catalunya, and after Operació Ubú (which parodied Jordi Pujol and confronted him with the governing nationalism), he became closer to the PSC, then in the opposition, although he confesses in his memoirs more to seek refuge from the boycotts of nationalism than by conviction.

Throughout his long career, with the common denominator of his defense of freedom and his criticism of dogmatism, he has made furious criticisms of the power, whether this whatever it was: to Jordi Pujol, Francisco Franco, some bishops and Esquerra Republicana de Catalunya, which has led to hatred of seemingly different sectors, such as the Spanish far-right, the Catalan independence movement (of right and left) and some sectors of Catholicism.

He has used his works to make acid parodies of relevant characters of the culture such as Salvador Dalí, but also to show a fond admiration for others like Josep Pla (in his Incredible story of Dr. Floit & Mr. Pla). All this has entailed enmities, both in the theatrical world and especially in the institutional world.

At present, he is belligerently opposed to the "Catalanist drift" (to nationalism) that he attributes to the PSC as a result of the Pact of Tinell and the policies of Catalan socialism in the years that he leads the autonomic government. He was one of the intellectual promoters of the civic platform Ciutadans de Catalunya, from which emerged the political party Ciudadanos party. In the second congress of this party he was a supporter of the opposition list to the one presented by Albert Rivera, and after the victory of this has moved away from the party. He clearly transferred his support to the new party Union, Progress and Democracy, with approaches analogous to the association Ciutadans de Catalunya, getting to participate in his act of presentation. But in the last times it has returned to support in public acts to the project of Ciudadanos.

On 16 January 2018, he was introduced as President in exile of Tabarnia, a satirical anti-independence movement in Catalonia trying to separate the provinces of Tarragona and Barcelona from the rest of Catalonia to create a hypothetical 18th autonomous community.

Television 
 La Odisea, 5 chapters - 5 chapters (1976 - 1977) TVE

Works 
Columbi Lapsus (1993)
Teledeum (1994).
Yo tengo un tío en América (1995).
El rapto de Talía (2000)
Memorias de un bufón (2001)
Buen viaje, excelencia (2003)
Adiós Cataluña. Crónicas de amor y de guerra (2007), Premio Espasa de Ensayo awards
Dios los cría y ellos hablan de sexo, drogas, España, corrupción... (2010), along with Fernando Sánchez-Dragó
Diarios de un francotirador (2012)
¡Viva Tabarnia! (2018), with a prologue of Mario Vargas Llosa

References

External links 

1943 births
Living people
Male actors from Barcelona
Writers from Barcelona
Catalan dramatists and playwrights
Spanish male dramatists and playwrights
20th-century Spanish male actors
Spanish activists
Exiles of the Spanish Civil War in France
Spanish theatre directors
Male stage actors from Catalonia
Politicians
Politicians from Barcelona
Spanish mimes